Hydromadinone (INN), also known as 6α-chloro-17α-hydroxyprogesterone, is a steroidal progestin of the 17α-hydroxyprogesterone group which was patented in 1967 but was never marketed. The C17α acetate ester of hydromadinone, hydromadinone acetate, also exists, but similarly was never marketed.

See also
 17α-Hydroxyprogesterone
 Chlormadinone
 Cyproterone
 Delmadinone
 Haloprogesterone

References

Diketones
Organochlorides
Pregnanes
Progestogens
Abandoned drugs